Andros Antoniadis (born 1939) is a Cypriot footballer. He played in six matches for the Cyprus national football team from 1963 to 1965.

References

External links
 

1939 births
Living people
Cypriot footballers
Cyprus international footballers
Place of birth missing (living people)
Association football midfielders
APOEL FC players